Regal Mountain is an eroded stratovolcano or shield volcano in the Wrangell Mountains of eastern Alaska. Regal Mountain is the third highest thirteener (a peak between 13,000 and 13,999 feet in elevation) in Alaska, ranking just behind its neighbor, Atna Peaks. Because the mountain is almost entirely covered in glaciers, no geological studies have been done, but published references state and the geological map shows that the mountain is an old eroded volcanic edifice.

Several major glaciers flow from the steep and heavily eroded flanks of Regal Mountain. The Rohn Glacier and Regal Glacier head east and southeast to join the Nizina Glacier, while the Root Glacier flows south  to join the Kennicott Glacier just above the town of McCarthy.


See also

List of mountain peaks of North America
List of mountain peaks of the United States
List of mountain peaks of Alaska
List of volcanoes in the United States

References

External links

Shield volcanoes of the United States
Stratovolcanoes of the United States
Subduction volcanoes
Landforms of Copper River Census Area, Alaska
Volcanoes of Alaska
Mountains of Alaska
Wrangell–St. Elias National Park and Preserve
North American 4000 m summits
Mountains of Unorganized Borough, Alaska
Volcanoes of Unorganized Borough, Alaska